Élie Antoine Octave Lignier (25 February 1855, in Pougy – 19 March 1916, in Caen) was a French botanist, known for his work in the field of paleobotany.

From 1880 to 1887 he worked as assistant to Charles Eugène Bertrand at the University of Lille. He obtained his doctorate in sciences at Paris, and from 1887 gave lectures in botany at the University of Caen. In 1889 he received the title of professor, and from 1896 served as director of the botanical garden at Caen. 

He is known for his pioneer research of what would become known as the "telome theory", a concept involving the evolutionary history of land plants. The fungus genera Ligniera (Maire & A.Tison, 1911; family Plasmodiophoraceae) and Lignieria (A.Chev.; family Melastomataceae, now a synonym of Dissotis ), commemorate his name.

Selected works 
 La Graine et le fruit des Calycanthées, 1891 – The seed and the fruit of Calycanthaceae.
 Végétaux fossiles de Normandie (7 parts 1894–1913) – Fossil plants of Normandy.
 Essai sur l'évolution morphologique du Règne végétal, 1909 – Essay on the morphological evolution of the plant kingdom.

References 

1855 births
1916 deaths
People from Aube
Academic staff of the University of Caen Normandy
Paleobotanists
19th-century French botanists
20th-century French botanists